Nuno Duarte Gil Mendes Bettencourt (born September 20, 1966) is a Portuguese-American guitarist, singer-songwriter, record producer, and businessman. He became known as the lead guitarist of the Boston rock band Extreme. He has also recorded a solo album as well as having founded bands including Mourning Widows, Population 1, DramaGods, and The Satellite Party.

Early life
Bettencourt was born on September 20, 1966 in Praia da Vitória, Terceira, Azores, Portugal, to Ezequiel Mendes Bettencourt and wife Aureolina da Cunha Gil de Ávila. When he was four years old, his family, including brothers Luís and Roberto, moved to Hudson, Massachusetts. Initially, Bettencourt had little interest in music, wanting to become an actor and preferring to spend his time playing hockey and football. His first instrument was the drums, and he played them exclusively until his brother Luís started teaching him the guitar. While Bettencourt was slow to adopt the instrument under his brother's tutelage, his skills quickly developed when he began teaching himself, and he has mentioned in many interviews that he would skip many school days to practice upwards of seven hours a day. In his sophomore and junior years of high school, Bettencourt dropped out of sports so he could focus on playing guitar. He eventually dropped out of high school altogether, for the same reason.

As a guitarist, one of Bettencourt's earliest influences was Eddie Van Halen. However, as he developed his craft as a guitarist and a songwriter, his influences expanded to embrace the Beatles, Led Zeppelin, Prince, Queen (Brian May), Ronni Le Tekrø (TNT), Pat Travers, Paco de Lucía, Al Di Meola, and Kayak.

Career

Extreme

Unable to make a dent in the music world with his Boston-based hair metal act Sinful, Bettencourt rose to international prominence as a guitar player after he joined the Boston-area group Extreme in 1985. Signed to A&M Records shortly after Bettencourt joined the group, the band released its debut record, Extreme. He then provided rhythm guitar on the single version of Janet Jackson's "Black Cat," which became a number one hit on the Billboard Hot 100.

In 1990, Extreme released their most critically acclaimed album, Pornograffitti, which included the hits "More Than Words" and "Hole Hearted". Pornograffitti garnered admiration for Bettencourt from rock guitar enthusiasts. He was voted "Best New Talent" in a 1991 readers' poll by Guitar World magazine, and that magazine later named him "Most Valuable Player" of 1991. Queen gutarist Brian May has called Bettencourt's solo from the song Get The Funk Out "a landmark in rock history that I think should have its own little medal struck and awarded to Nuno Bettencourt and Extreme."

The band followed up with III Sides to Every Story in 1992. Bettencourt composed and arranged the brass and string sections, and full orchestra for this album. In 1995, Extreme released the album Waiting for the Punchline, but the band broke up in 1996 when Bettencourt decided to pursue a solo career. Shortly afterward, singer Gary Cherone became the lead singer of Van Halen.

Extreme's hiatus / Other bands
In 1997, Bettencourt released his first solo effort, Schizophonic, which he had been working on for five years. The album was well-received critically, but was not a commercial success.

On December 16, 1997, Bettencourt's new band Mourning Widows (whose name was inspired by writing he had seen on a church wall in Portugal) released their self-titled debut album in Japan on Polydor Records. It sold 45,000 in the first month. The band featured his nephew Donovan Bettencourt on bass and New York drummer Jeff Consi. In 2000, Mourning Widow's follow-up, Furnished Souls for Rent originally released in Japan, and then in the U.S. Both Mourning Widows releases cultivated a strong following in Japan and New England.

Bettencourt formed the recording entity Population 1 and released the self-titled and self-produced 2002 release, Population 1, on Universal/Japan and YBM/Korea. In 2004, Population 1 released Sessions from Room Four. Due to legal issues, the band was renamed to Near Death Experience in 2005. The band was then renamed DramaGods. DramaGods released its first album in December 2005 as an import; it was made available as a digital download in 2006.

Bettencourt's playing has been featured at 2004 on the Universal/Japan CD and DVD release of Guitar Wars featuring solo and collective performances of Bettencourt with many others, including Steve Hackett (Genesis, GTR), Led Zeppelin bassist John Paul Jones and Mr. Big/Racer X guitarist Paul Gilbert.

Bettencourt was the lead guitarist for Satellite Party, which is a band formed by Jane's Addiction frontman Perry Farrell. Bettencourt played with the band at the 2005 Lollapalooza festival. Bettencourt helped produce Ultra Payloaded, the debut album by Satellite Party released on May 29, 2007 on Columbia Records. In late July 2007, Bettencourt departed Satellite Party due to concerns about the direction of the band's live show.

Extreme reunion
In 2007, Extreme reformed with its original lineup (with the exception of Paul Geary) to begin work on a new album, Saudades de Rock. The album was released on August 12, 2008.

In 2008, Bettencourt was featured on the soundtrack for the motion picture Smart People. The soundtrack also features the Gary Cherone track, "Need I Say More", and Baby Animals selections. The following year, Bettencourt was featured in a song and video called "Best Night Ever" by Marshall Eriksen, a character on How I Met Your Mother. The video was a parody of Extreme's "More Than Words" video, in which the entire main cast of How I Met Your Mother made appearances.

Additional works
In 1991, Bettencourt produced Dweezil Zappa's release on Barking Pumpkin Records, Confessions. On this record Bettencourt also sings lead vocals for the first time, on a semi-ballad entitled "The Kiss". Extreme members Gary Cherone and Pat Badger also contributed.

In 1993, Bettencourt co-wrote and produced "Where Are You Going" for the Super Mario Bros. movie. He also joined Robert Palmer in the studio to record Palmer's album Honey. According to former Journey lead singer Steve Perry, Bettencourt has teamed with him to write and arrange songs. He also has written and recorded with Tantric (Bettencourt co-wrote Tantric's hit single "Hey Now"), BB Mak, and Toni Braxton.

Bettencourt has also collaborated with singer Suze DeMarchi and with all of her Baby Animals bandmates. On Baby Animals' second release, Shaved and Dangerous, he produced a few songs and co-wrote "Because I Can". He also contributed to the writing, recording, and production of DeMarchi's solo debut from 1999, Telelove. In 1999, Bettencourt produced the album Magnolia, for the Portuguese singer and actress Lúcia Moniz. He also featured as singer and guitarist in the song "Try Again", which was included in Magnolia.

In 2006, Bettencourt and his band DramaGods contributed their song "S'OK" to the album project Artists for Charity—Guitarists 4 the Kids, produced by Slang Productions to assist World Vision Canada in helping children in need.

In November 2009, Bettencourt toured with singer Rihanna on her Last Girl on Earth Tour as lead guitarist, having appeared alongside her in several TV shows and other performances. He has since performed as Rihanna's lead guitarist on every subsequent tour, including her Loud (2010), 777 (2012) and Diamonds World (2013) tours.

In July 2011, Steel Panther reported to Loud magazine that Nuno would be "coming in to do something" on their then-upcoming release Balls Out. The collaboration resulted in the track "It Won't Suck Itself", which also featured Nickelback frontman Chad Kroeger.

In April 2022, Bettencourt joined Julian Lennon on an acoustic cover of Julian's father John Lennon's hit "Imagine" to benefit Global Citizen's Stand Up For Ukraine.

On February 12, 2023 Bettencourt re-united with Rihanna in the Super Bowl LVII halftime show performance in Glendale, Arizona.

Atlantis Entertainment

In 2016, Bettencourt founded media production company Atlantis Entertainment (of which he is CEO) with Rene Rigal and Steven Schuurman.

Personal life
Bettencourt married Suze DeMarchi in 1994. They have two children together, Bebe Bettencourt born in 1996 and Lorenzo Aureolino Bettencourt in 2002. The couple divorced in 2013.

Discography
with Extreme
 Extreme (1989)
 Extreme II: Pornograffitti (1990)
 III Sides to Every Story: Yours/Mine/The Truth (1992)
 Waiting for the Punchline (1995)
 Saudades de Rock (2008)
 Take Us Alive (2010)
 Six (2023)

with Nuno
 Schizophonic (1997)

with Mourning Widows
 Mourning Widows (1998)
 Furnished Souls for Rent (2000)

with Polutation 1
 Population 1 (2002)
 Sessions from Room 4 (2004)

with DramaGods
 Love (2005)

with Satellite Party
 Ultra Payloaded (2007)

with Generation Axe
 The Guitars That Destroyed the World: Live in China (2019)

Solo career
 Best of Nuno (2003)
 Smart People (Original Soundtrack) (2008)

as a Guest musician

 Janet Jackson's Rhythm Nation 1814 (1989), by Janet Jackson
 Putting Back The Rock (1990), by Jim Gilmore
 Confessions (1991), by Dweezil Zappa
 Guitars Practicing Musicians Vol. 2 (1991), from Red Distribution Records
 Guitars That Rule The World, Vol. 1 (1992), from Metal Blade Records
 Mixin' It Up: The Best of the Dan Reed Network (1993), by Dan Reed Network
 We Are the Majority (1993), by J.
 Shaved and Dangerous (1993), by Baby Animals
 Super Mario Bros. Original Motion Pictures Soundtrack (1993), from Capitol Records
 Kiss My Ass: Classic Kiss Regrooved (1994), from Mercury Records
 Honey (1994), by Robert Palmer
 Telelove (1999), by Suze DeMarchi
 After We Go (2004), by Tantric
 Numbers from the Beast (2005), from Rykodisc Records
 Libra (2005), by Toni Braxton
 GONG (2005), by JAM Project
 Africans in the Snow (2007), by T.M. Stevens
 Music from the Mound (2007), from EMI America Records
 Loud (2010), by Rihanna
 The World As We Love It (2011), by Pushking
 Fastlife (2011), by Joe Jonas
 Balls Out (2011), by Steel Panther
 Talk That Talk (2011), by Rihanna
 "Sold for Free" - Single (2014), by Tama Girard
 Anti (2016), by Rihanna
 Feed the Machine (2017), by Nickelback
 Vortex (2022), by Derek Sherinian

References

External links
Official site

[ Nuno Bettencourt] at Allmusic
Nuno Bettencourt at Discogs

1966 births
American heavy metal guitarists
American music arrangers
American people of Azorean descent
American tenors
American rock singers
American male singer-songwriters
Extreme (band) members
Lead guitarists
Living people
People from Hudson, Massachusetts
People from Praia da Vitória
Portuguese emigrants to the United States
Portuguese expatriates in the United States
Portuguese heavy metal guitarists
Portuguese record producers
Portuguese male singer-songwriters
Warner Records artists
Singer-songwriters from Massachusetts
American male guitarists
American rock songwriters
Portuguese singer-songwriters
Guitarists from Massachusetts
Record producers from Massachusetts
20th-century American guitarists
20th-century American male musicians
Generation Axe members
Satellite Party members
American people of Portuguese descent